The men's 100 metre breaststroke event at the 1968 Summer Olympics took place between 18 and 19 October. This swimming event used the breaststroke. Because an Olympic size swimming pool is 50 metres long, this race consisted of two lengths of the pool.

Medalists

Results

Heats
Heat 1

Heat 2

Heat 3

Heat 4

Heat 5

Heat 6

Semifinals

Heat Two

Heat Three

Final

Key: OR = Olympic record

References

Men's breaststroke 100 metre
Men's events at the 1968 Summer Olympics